Toronto Eagles may refer to:

 Toronto Eagles (Australian rules football) , Canadian Australian rules football club competing in the AFL Ontario. 
 Toronto Eagles (soccer) Canadian soccer team, now known as SC Toronto